Abacetus lucifugus is a species of ground beetle in the subfamily Pterostichinae. It was described by Andrewes in 1924.

References

lucifugus
Beetles described in 1924